Wilson Martins (March 3, 1921 in São Paulo – January 30, 2010) was a Brazilian literary critic and cultural historian who was a regular contributor for the Jornal do Brasil and O Estado de S.Paulo.

He graduated from the Universidade Federal do Paraná and taught at New York University from 1965 to 1991. In 2002, the Academia Brasileira de Letras awarded him the Prêmio Machado de Assis for his lifetime's work.

Works
His major works include:
 O Modernismo (1965, 5ª ed. 1977) - tr. Jack Tomlins (1971), The modernist idea: a critical survey of Brazilian writing in the twentieth century, New York University Press,  reviewed at 
 História da Inteligência Brasileira - 7 volumes
 A Crítica Literária no Brasil - 2 volumes

Further reading
 Sanches Neto, M. (1997). Wilson Martins. Editora UFPR.  - in Portuguese
 (2001). Mestre da crítica: edição commemorativa dos 80 anos do crítico literario Wilson Martins, Professor Emérito da Universidade de Nova Iorque. Imprensa Oficial do Paraná.  - in Portuguese

References

External links
 Bio details, Instituto Histórico e Geográfico Brasileiro - in Portuguese
 Bio details, Revista de Cultura - in Portuguese

Brazilian literary critics
Brazilian literary historians
Writers from São Paulo
New York University alumni
1921 births
2010 deaths